The Fujifilm FinePix A345 and A350 are entry-level digital point-and-shoot cameras. They feature 3x optical zoom, a resolution of 4.1 and 5.2 megapixels respectively, and 320x240 (at 15fps) movie recording with sound capabilities.

Transferring pictures
The camera has a number of ways to transfer pictures.

 The XD-Picture Card (up to 512 MB) can be removed and inserted into a computer, printer, or other device that accepts such cards.
 Media can be transferred via USB with the supplied USB adapter or cable (or any USB cable with a USB-A connector on one end, and a mini-B connector on the other) to a computer, via DSC mode.
 Media can be transferred via USB to devices that support PTP while the camera is in PictBridge mode.
 Media can be displayed/recorded by any device that has standard A/V RCA connections (i.e. nearly any modern television, VCR, PVR, etc.)

Boxed materials
Included with a retail purchase of the camera are:
 The camera itself.
 A 16Mb XD-Picture Card
 A video adapter cable
 A USB adapter cable
 Software CD for Windows and Macintosh
 Documents:
 A 93 page manual
 Quickstart page in English
 Quickstart page in Spanish
 Safety instructions page
 Registration card
 Sample "real pictures" advertisement

Sample pictures

References and notes

External links
 Official site information about the A350
 product information page
 Technical Specifications
 Brochure (PDF)

A350